Little Giant is a 1946 Abbott and Costello film.

Little Giant or Little Giants may also refer to:

People
Stephen A. Douglas (1813–1861), American politician defeated by Abraham Lincoln in the 1860 presidential election
Johnny Griffin (1928–2008), American jazz saxophonist

Film and television
The Little Giant (1926 film), an American silent comedy film
The Little Giant (1933 film), a film starring Edward G. Robinson
Little Giants, a 1994 comedy featuring Rick Moranis and Ed O'Neill 
The Small Giant, a French cartoon series

Other uses
Wabash Little Giants, the athletics teams of Wabash College, beginning in 1884
Newark Little Giants, a professional baseball team based in Newark, New Jersey in the late 1880s
The Little Giant (album), a 1959 album by Johnny Griffin and his all-star sextet
Little Giant Ladder System, manufactured by Wing Enterprises, founded in the 1970s
Little Giant (album), 2014 studio album by Roo Panes
Little Giant trucks, manufactured by Chicago Pneumatic between 1911-1917.